{{Automatic taxobox
| image = Smed.jpg
| image_caption = Schmidtea mediterranea
| taxon = Schmidtea
| authority = Ball, 1974
| subdivision_ranks = Species
| subdivision_ref = <ref>*Tyler S, Schilling S, Hooge M, and Bush LF (comp.) (2006-2012) Turbellarian taxonomic database. Version 1.7  Database </ref>
| subdivision = Schmidtea lugubrisSchmidtea mediterraneaSchmidtea novaSchmidtea polychroa}}Schmidtea is a genus of freshwater triclads. Species of the genus Schmidtea are widely used in regeneration and developmental studies.

Until 1991 Schmidtea was considered as a subgenus of Dugesia'', then it was elevated to the genus rank.

Phylogeny
Phylogenetic tree including five dugesiid genera after Álvarez-Presas et al., 2008:

References

Dugesiidae